Prelude to Harvest is a 1963 Australian television play. It was written by Kay Keavney and directed by Colin Dean.

The production was broadcast to celebrate the 175th anniversary of Captain Phillip's landing at Sydney Cove.

Plot
In January 1789 in London, a ship is loading up with convicts including 200 women. Six months later the ship is still there with the convicts on board, in miserable condition.

In Sydney, a ship is meant to arrive with supplies but is wrecked on the way. Governor Philip must come up with a plan to avoid famine in the colony.

Cast
Wynn Roberts as Governor Phillip
Deryc Barnes as John Nicol
Edward Howell as Lt Edgar, RN
Neva Carr-Glyn was Mrs Barnsley
Richard Meikle as Captain Collins
Alan Herbert as Briggs
Terry McDermott as James Ruse
Joan Morrow as Sarah
Mary Reynolds as Elizabeth
Henry Gilbert as Major Ross
Reg Gorman as seaman
Ric Hutton as Watkin Tench
Edmund Pegge as Lt Daws
Keith Buckley as Lt King, RN
Betty Dyson

Production
Australia Day 1963 would mark the 17th anniversary of Captain Phillip's landing at Sydney Cove. The ABC decided to commemorate it by commissioning two productions to screen over the Australia Day weekend - The Land That Waited, a 50-minute documentary on the history of white exploration and settlement in Australia which screened on Saturday January 26, and Prelude to Harvest.

Rehearsals took place on November 12–14, 1962.

References

External links
Prelude to Harvest at AustLit (subscription required)

1960s Australian television plays